Go COMO, formerly Columbia Transit, is a city-owned public bus system that serves the city of Columbia, Missouri. The system operates Monday through Saturday, except on major holidays. Services include fixed-route services, bookings for para-transit shuttles for the disabled, a system of commuter shuttles for students and employees of the University of Missouri, and hotel shuttles (known as the "Spirit Shuttle") during MU football games.  In fiscal year 2009, 2,007,263 rides were logged along the system's six fixed routes and University of Missouri Shuttle routes, while the latest available records show 27,000 rides logged aboard the para-transit service.

History
The system was formerly operated by the Columbia Municipal Bus Lines Company from 1945 to 1965. On September 10, 1965, after the company went out of business, the city of Columbia took over the operation of the system. Originally it had ten orbital routes, in addition to the university routes for students and staff. In 1982, the Wabash Station in downtown Columbia (built in 1910 as a rail depot) became the system's central transfer point. Since then, the station has been expanded and renovated. Beginning in the early 1970s, the system has undergone many changes and serves citizens and students in a variety of ways. Ridership levels have varied throughout the system's history, and have increased during recent years. Current ridership is at record levels.

Columbia Transit officially changed its name to Go COMO. In June 2019 Go COMO switched to a fixed-route system with six fixed routes and the historical Wabash Station as the hub.

Routes
The main connector routes, 1 Black and 2 Gold, have frequent service and are joined to by feeder routes which run less often, generally circulating in residential neighborhoods.

Para-transit
In 1990 Columbia Transit began providing curb-to-curb para-transit service to those eligible, in accordance with the Americans with Disabilities Act. This service utilizes van-based buses, equipped with wheelchair lifts. Passengers can request transportation between any two points within the city limits. The fare is $2.00 per one-way trip. All rides must be booked one business day in advance; this can be done online at the city's website.

Fare structure
Fares for Go COMO fixed routes vary from $.75 to $1.50, with several discounted fares available. Transfers are issued (upon request) when fares are paid, and are good for one-way trips only. Passengers may transfer from route to route at several pre-arranged points where two (or more) bus routes intersect. Go COMO also offers a variety of FASTPass fare cards and electronic transfers.

Fares
Adult Fare $1.50
Adult Day Pass $3.00
Seniors, Disabled, Medicare recipients, medicaid recipients, and income eligible are $.75 One-Way or $1.50 Day Pass
ParaTransit Fare $2.00 
Customers 18 and under are free

FASTPass electronic fare cards
30-day unlimited (full-fare/half-fare)      $55.00/$25.00
25-ride pass (full-fare/half-fare)          $30.00/$15.00
Student Semester Pass(with valid student ID)$100

Fleet
Go COMO operates a diverse fleet of 41 transit buses, eleven para-transit vans and several support vehicles. Most buses are 35- and 40-foot New Flyer low-floor buses. In addition, the system also uses several 40-foot Gillig Corporation Phantom buses, 30-foot ElDorado National buses, and two Gilling 40-foot Euro-style buses. Most of the fleet is planned to be replaced by 2015, pending budgetary approval. The city may purchase hybrid and/or methane-powered buses in the future.

The City Council decided (in a unanimous vote on November 16, 2009) to approve a measure for transit advertising. The decision came after a five-year debate on the issue, with the threat of budget decreases pushing through the measure. The city received two bids after requesting them in August of that year, with the larger potential-income proposal coming from Midwest-based Transit Advertising (a firm specializing in transit advertisements). The company's bid guaranteed an income of at least $204,000 per year of which Columbia Transit would keep 60%, or $122,400 (whichever was greater). Advertisements vary from small banners inside buses to full bus wrap ads.   
All fixed-route buses are equipped with bike racks which can carry two standard bicycles. Use of the bike racks is provided at no additional charge.

Evolution
In recent years, the Columbia Transit system has undergone several changes to service and infrastructure. During this time, ridership levels for the fixed-route system have grown from around 400,000 passengers in 2003 to over 2 million riders per year. In 2004 City Council approved motions for the renovation and expansion of Wabash Station in downtown Columbia; federal funding was approved for construction. In June 2004, many changes were made to the primary routes in an effort to reduce headway times (which had continued to grow because of traffic congestion). Changes were made to the 4-Red, 3-Green and 2-Blue routes; the 5-Yellow route was reduced (due to poor ridership) from a peak-service commuter route along Forum Boulevard to a one-morning/one-afternoon weekday run, with a transfer to the 1-Orange. While no trolley buses were purchased, due to strong popular support the 6-Brown Downtown Orbiter was introduced along with the 7-Purple Theater Special, a route running from Forum 8 Goodrich Theater to Hollywood Stadium 14 Theater with a transfer to the 6-Brown at University Hospital, roughly halfway between the two theaters. In June, 2006, the FASTPass electronic fare card program was introduced along with electronic transfer slips. Other changes during that month had the 6-Brown's extended at-peak service removed Thursday evenings, and the 7-Purple was rerouted to the Wabash Station to encourage ridership. In August of that year, the 8-Gold route was introduced to the university system. The 8-Gold service area includes Campus View, the Reserve and several other student-housing complexes. At the time the route was partially funded by the owners of those complexes, although the university later contributed operating funds. This route has since grown into three different routes (now routes 207 and 208W/E), and are key components of the university's shuttle system.

In June 2007, a $2.3 million renovation and expansion of the Wabash bus station on North Tenth Street began after nearly a decade of planning. The building has been on the National Register of Historic Places since 1979, so construction had to retain the building's historic quality. The project included exterior renovation of the original structure, remodeling of the interior and passenger lobby, construction of an administrative wing and a large canopy-covered bus port extending into the rear lot. As part of the "percent for art" program, one percent of the total construction cost was dedicated to artwork primarily by local artists. Two Boone County artists, painter David Spear and sculptor Don Asbee, created large oil paintings of the former and current station for the lobby and a metal train sculpture underneath the bus port. The project was completed by summer 2008.

Between major projects and modifications, several amenities have been upgraded throughout the system. Bus shelters and benches have been added, and the fleet has periodically been updated. In November 2007, LED electronic destination signs were installed to replace the scroll-style signs prone to ripping during operation. In fall 2010, advertisements made their way aboard city buses. There are additional projects awaiting funding for infrastructure improvement and larger projects well into the planning stage. Many planned improvements and developments are aimed to expand service area and operation times and improving local transportation coordination, as well as adding new infrastructure and facilities. In August 2010 the fixed-route system was reconfigured, taking existing routes and rerouting them to extend the service area. Saturday routes (previously different from weekday routes) were aligned with weekday routes. The 105 Yellow route was restored to commuter-route status as the 105 Purple route; a transfer between 105 and 101 was added, and the 101 Orange Route South was rescheduled to travel against the congestion which had previously caused delays.

References

External links
 Columbia Transit & Paratransit

Bus transportation in Missouri
Transportation in Columbia, Missouri